is a town located in Miyako District, Fukuoka Prefecture, Japan.

Miyako was founded on March 20, 2006 from the amalgamation of three towns in the Miyako District; Katsuyama (勝山), Saigawa (犀川) and Toyotsu (豊津). On April 30, 2017, the estimated population of Miyako was 20,286. The total area of the town is 151.28km².

Saigawa
The Saigawa District is a mountainous area, with the Imagawa and Haraigawa rivers flowing through the district. It also has the Fukuoka Prefectural Road 34, and the Heisei Chikuho railway crossing through the district. The name "Saigawa" came from the Shinto God, which is also known as "Sai no Kami" in Japan. It is enshrined at a crossing place along the Imagawa river. The name combines two words, "Sai" from "Sai no Kami", and "gawa" from "kawa" which means river in Japanese.

History
In 1905, East Saigawa Village, West Saigawa Village, and Minami Saigawa Village merged to form the Saigawa Village. It was renamed as Saigawa Town in 1943, and expanded to include the Irahara Village in 1956. In 2006, Saigawa Town merged with Katsuyama and Toyotsu to form Miyako District.

Irahara
Irahara is located in Miyako Town, south of Yukuhashi, Fukuoka and is surrounded by natural features. It is located along Route 496 at 33°42'N, 130°55'E and is 253 m above sea level. The town has an area of 2, 356 km2 and a population of 284.

History
People were first identified to be living in Irahara approximately 3000 years ago during the Jōmon period. In 2017, most of the town was submerged in water following the construction of the Irahara Dam.

Landmark Architecture
The Naganuma House is a historical building that was constructed in 1839. It represents the lifestyle in the Edo era.

Wildlife
The Miyako Sawa-Gani is an endangered freshwater crab that is native to Miyako Island. The species cannot survive in sea water and live in habitats that are confined to inland waters or land.

Kagura
Kagura is a traditional Noh dance common in Irahara, meant to praise and appease the Shinto gods. The actions represent the stories of Japanese myths, and the dance has been passed down from parents to children for generations.

Irahara Dam
Miyako Town experiences frequent flooding due to its close proximity to the shore. In 2017, the multipurpose Irahara Dam was constructed to prevent floods and contain tap water.

Harai River
The Harai River is 31 km long and flows from Irahara to Yukuhashi City. Fireflies are common around the river in early summer.

Festivals
Many festivals are held throughout the year and are mainly concerned with agriculture. Jinkosai is a festival held in May where Kagura is common.

Food
Traditional foods include Hawasabi and rice.

Climate
The climate in Miyako is warm and it is in the temperate climate zone. Miyako has high annual rainfall at 1282 mm | 50.5 inch. The average annual temperature in the town is 10.9 °C | 51.6 °F.

References
Japanese Wikipedia Miyako article

Miyako, I. (2020). Miyako climate: Average Temperature, weather by month, Miyako water temperature - Climate-Data.org. Retrieved 28 October 2020, from https://en.climate-data.org/asia/japan/iwate/miyako-5144/

External links

Miyako official website 

Towns in Fukuoka Prefecture